Heroes of Might and Magic: A Strategic Quest is a turn-based strategy game developed and published by New World Computing in 1995 for DOS. A spin-off of New World Computing's Might and Magic series of role-playing video games, the success of Heroes of Might and Magic led to a number of sequels.

In 1996, NWC released an updated version of the game, ported to Windows 95. This new version included a map editor, random map generator, CD audio, and new scenarios. As a bonus, King's Bounty was also included on the CD.

Story 
Heroes of Might and Magic tells the story of Lord Morglin Ironfist, who is forced to flee his homeland through a magical portal, because his cousin, Ragnar, had usurped the throne after his uncle, Ragnar's father, killed Ironfist's father, the legitimate owner of the throne.

He finds himself along with his few followers in a strange and uncharted land, called Enroth. The land is unruled but contested by Ironfist and three other warlords: the barbarian Lord Slayer, the sorceress Queen Lamanda, and the warlock Lord Alamar.

In the canonical storyline, Lord Ironfist defeats his three opponents and founds a new kingdom in Enroth. It is possible for the player to lead the other factions to victory, however this is not reflected in the following games of the Heroes of Might and Magic series.

Gameplay 

Heroes of Might and Magic takes place in a medieval fantasy world filled with creatures frequently associated with myth and legend. These creatures compose the military forces (troops) with which the player attempts to conquer opponents. The player leads generals through the game world at the head of armies of troops. These generals, called "heroes," provide a means to explore, attack, defeat, and acquire, the four basic principles in the game. The ultimate goal of the game is usually to capture all enemy castles and defeat all enemy heroes. However, the game comes with many different play scenarios, and some of these scenarios have unique victory conditions, such as accumulating a certain amount of gold, or finding a particular artifact.

There are four different classes of heroes and castles, each with their own units and strengths/weaknesses. The two "might" classes, Knight and Barbarian, earn skill points in attack or defense more often than in spell power or knowledge. The two "magic" classes, Sorceress and Warlock, earn skill points in spell power or knowledge more often than in attack or defense. There is also a neutral, "wandering" class of troops, including Rogues, Nomads, Ghosts (the only one that cannot be hired) and Genies.

Development
Heroes of Might and Magic was first released near the end of September 1995.

Reception

In mid-November 1995, New World Computing reported that Heroes of Might and Magic had shipped 100,000 copies to retailers and that sell-through was strong. The company announced that the game was "set to top the 100,000 mark in unit sales". By October 1997, the combined sales of Heroes of Might and Magic, Heroes II and the Price of Loyalty expansion had surpassed 500,000 copies. The series as a whole sold 1.5 million copies by December 1999.

Andy Butcher reviewed Heroes of Might and Magic for Arcane magazine, rating it a 7 out of 10 overall. Butcher comments that "Its very simplicity, although ultimately limiting, is appealing, and the computer opponents are far from easy to beat.  In terms of depth and long-term interest it's not a real challenger to MicroProse's Master of Magic, which it resembles, but it is a whole lot simpler to get into."

A reviewer for Next Generation assessed that "Heroes of Might and Magic is part wargame, part adventure, and part sim. It seamlessly captures the best of all three genres, and presents the whole package with bright, colorful visuals." He further applauded the game for being "easy to learn, but difficult to master" and having great longevity. He scored it four out of five stars. GameSpot rated the game's production values as somewhat below par, and regarded the story as being thin. Nonetheless, the game was complimented for its gameplay, and received a 7.5 out of 10 overall. It received a Golden Triad Award from Computer Game Review.

Heroes of Might and Magic was named 1995's best turn-based strategy game by Computer Games Strategy Plus—tied with Jagged Alliance—and best overall strategy title by Computer Game Review and Computer Gaming World, tied variously with Command & Conquer, Gazillionaire and Blood Bowl. Similarly, PC Gamer US nominated Heroes for its 1995 "Best Strategy Game" award, although this prize went instead to Command & Conquer. The editors of Computer Gaming World wrote, "Heroes will challenge you to think and plan, and it will reward you with hours of sheer pleasure. It is one of the most addictive games to come along in years."

In 1996, Computer Gaming World declared Heroes of Might and Magic the 133th-best computer game ever released. The editors called it "a brilliantly balanced game of fantasy combat".

References

External links 

1995 video games
DOS games
DOS games ported to Windows
Heroes of Might and Magic
Classic Mac OS games
New World Computing games
The 3DO Company games
Video games developed in the United States
Video games scored by Paul Romero
Windows games
Games commercially released with DOSBox
Video games about genies
Multiplayer and single-player video games

es:Heroes of Might and Magic#Heroes of Might and Magic